Stackhousia scoparia is a species of plant in the family Celastraceae.

It blooms between August and January producing yellow-green-brown flowers.

The species is found in the Wheatbelt, Great Southern and Goldfields-Esperance regions of Western Australia where it grows in gravel-sand-loam soils over laterite.

References

scoparia
Plants described in 1863